Mount Lyall is located on the border of Alberta and British Columbia on the Continental Divide. It was named in 1917 after the Scottish botanist David Lyall (1817–1895).

See also
 List of peaks on the British Columbia–Alberta border

References

Two-thousanders of Alberta
Two-thousanders of British Columbia
Canadian Rockies